Martin Boehm was (until 2021) the Dean of IE Business School, and is now the rector of EBS Universität für Wirtschaft und Recht. He currently serves on the board of the Graduate Management Admission Council as well as on the European Foundation for Management Development's EQUIS and EOCCS Accreditation Board. Boehm is also a member of the Industry Advisory Board for the EMBA Council.

Publications 
 Gensler, S., Verhoef, P., Böhm, M. (2011). “Understanding Consumers’ Multichannel Choices Across the Different Stages of the Buying Process”. Marketing Letters. Vol. 23(4): 987-1003
 Boehm, M. (2007). “Determining The Impact Of Internet Channel Use On A Customer’S Lifetime”. Journal of Interactive Marketing. Vol. 22(3): 2-22
 Marcos, F.  (2012). “El ámbito de aplicación subjetivo de la Ley de Defensa de la Competencia”. Revista de Derecho Constitucional, Civil y Mercantil. Vol. 142, 2012

References

German academic administrators
Living people
University of New South Wales alumni
Reutlingen University alumni
Year of birth missing (living people)